The Lampasas Resorters were a minor league baseball team based in Lampasas, Texas. In in 1914, the Resorters played the season as charter members of the Class D level Middle Texas League, placing 5th in the eight–team league.

History
The 1914 Lampasas Resorters began minor league play when the franchise became charter members of the Class D level Middle Texas League. The Middle Texas League began play as a six–team league, with the six franchises based in Bartlett, Texas (Bartlett Bearcats), Belton, Texas (Belton Braves), Brenham, Texas (Brenham Brewers), Georgetown, Texas (Georgetown Collegians), Lampasas, Texas and Temple, Texas (Temple Tigers).

The "Resorters" moniker derived from local industry. Lampasas, Texas was home to several mineral springs resorts in the era.

On May 8, 1914, the Lampasas Resorters began their first season of play in the Middle Texas League. The league played a spit–season schedule. The Resorters finished the 1914 season in 5th place. With an overall record of 35–51, Lampasas finished 21.5 games behind 1st place Temple, playing under managers Jesse Estill and Luke Roberts. Lampasas did not qualify for the playoffs as the Temple Tigers won the first half standings and the Belton Braves won the second half standings. The final overall standings were led by the Temple Tigers (54–27), followed by the Georgetown Collegians (50–30), Brenham Brewers (50–34), Belton Braves (37–47), Lampasas Resorters (35–51) and Bartlett Bearcats (22–59). In the championship playoff, the Belton Braves defeated Temple.

The Lampasas Resorters permanently folded after the 1914 season. The Lampasas Resorters and Georgetown Collegians were replaced by the Austin Reps and Schulenburg Giants in the 1915 Middle Texas League.

The ballpark
The name and location of the Lampasas home ballpark is not directly referenced. Turner Field Park was in use in the era. Turner Park is still in use as a public park, located at 808 Campbell Street, Lampasas, Texas.

Year–by–year record

Notable alumni
No Lampasas Resorters alumni appeared in the major leagues.

References

External links
Baseball Reference

Defunct minor league baseball teams
Defunct baseball teams in Texas
Baseball teams established in 1914
Baseball teams disestablished in 1914
Middle Texas League teams
Lampasas County, Texas